El Uqsor may refer to:

El Uqsor or Luxor, the former city of Thebes, Egypt
El Uqsor, a pseudonym of Dmitri Borgmann